Saheli may refer to:
Ormeloxifene, a pharmaceutical
Saheli (film), a Pakistani film 
Saheli Rural District, in Iran